Throwblock Muzic is the sixth album released by B-Legit. It was released on November 20, 2007 for Sick Wid It Records and SMC Recordings and featured production from B-Legit, Mike Mosley and G-Man Stan.

Track listing
"G.A.M.E." (featuring Mac Dre & Taj-He-Spitz) - 3:28
"Get This Money" - 3:05
"Physical" - 3:36
"Hands on Them Knees" (featuring Duna) - 4:28
"Freak Show" (featuring E-40, Levitti & 918) - 5:04
"Stickem" - 3:27
"Lounge Beat" - 4:29
"Where My Bitches At" - 4:09
"Shinnin" (featuring Taj-He-Spitz & 2wiceberg Slym) - 3:38
"Stunna Man" - 3:19
"Bela Bluntz" (featuring J. Minix) - 4:07
"D Boye" - 4:02
"Sittin" (featuring Clyde Carson & Taj-He-Spitz) - 2:35
"Where Is This Going" (featuring Levitti) - 3:57
"Lil Mama" (featuring Harm & Quazadelic) - 3:27
"Block Movement, Pt. 2" (featuring Clyde Carson & Duna) - 2:56

2007 albums
B-Legit albums
SMC Recordings albums